George Augustus Sheridan (February 22, 1840 – October 7, 1896) was an American  Civil War veteran and politician who, along with Effingham Lawrence is known for serving for the shortest term in congressional history, serving for just one day in the U.S. House of Representatives.

Biography
Sheridan was born in Millbury, Massachusetts, and moved with his parents to Chicago in 1858.

Civil War 
During the Civil War, he served as a captain in the Union Army until his resignation on October 28, 1864.

After the war, Sheridan was one of a group of Northern officials who moved in to administer the defeated Southern states (often derisively referred to by Southerners as "carpetbaggers"). In 1866, he moved to New Orleans, Louisiana; there he served as brigadier general of militia on the staff of the Republican Governor, Henry Clay Warmoth. In 1867, Sheridan was made sheriff of Carroll Parish in northeastern Louisiana, which was later divided into East Carroll and West Carroll parishes.

Congress 
Sheridan ran for the House in 1872 as a Liberal Republican against then Lt. Gov. P. B. S. Pinchback. After the election, Pinchback would become the first black governor of a U.S. state following the impeachment of the prior governor Henry C. Warmoth. Pinchback originally had credentials to be seated and the House was inclined to do so, but did not wish to be as he had also won a seat in the Senate (that he was never allowed to take). Sheridan contested the election and the matter wasn't fully settled until March 3, 1875, the last day of Congress. He was sworn in in the morning, serving until noon the next day.

After Congress 
After his service in the House, he was appointed Recorder of Deeds in the District of Columbia by President Rutherford Hayes, serving from May 17, 1878, until May 17, 1881, when President James Garfield fired him in order to provide the job to Frederick Douglass.

Family 
His daughter was the actress, Emma Sheridan.

Death 
Sheridan died at the age of fifty-six in the National Home for Disabled Volunteer Soldiers in Hampton, Virginia. He was interred at Arlington National Cemetery.

See also
List of members of the United States Congress by brevity of service

References

External links
Page about Sheridan from the Arlington website
Entry in the Congressional Biographical Dictionary

1840 births
1896 deaths
People from Millbury, Massachusetts
Liberal Republican Party members of the United States House of Representatives
Members of the United States House of Representatives from Louisiana
Union Army officers
People of Illinois in the American Civil War
Politicians from Chicago
Politicians from New Orleans
Burials at Arlington National Cemetery
19th-century American politicians
Louisiana Liberal Republicans
Military personnel from Massachusetts